William Simeon McPhail (2 February 1928 – 4 April 2003) was a Scottish football player who played for Queen's Park, Clyde and Celtic. He scored three goals in Celtic's record 7–1 victory over Rangers in the 1957 Scottish League Cup Final. After retiring, he developed a neurodegenerative disease, which he believed to be a result of brain damage acquired from heading footballs. He was the younger brother of fellow player John McPhail.

Career 

McPhail's 17-year playing career began when he signed for Queen's Park in 1941. He was a centre forward and soon earned the nickname "Teazy Weazy." He was, according to football historian Bob Crampsey, "an extremely graceful player... a particularly good header of a ball".

He was then sold to Clyde in 1947, but his career there was interrupted with recurring injuries. He had an excellent scoring record whilst with the Bully Wee, scoring 90 goals in 137 league games. At Clyde, McPhail missed the 1955 Scottish Cup Final with injury.

His early career at Shawfield was interrupted in January 1948 when he was called up to the army. McPhail continued to play football in the army. He represented the Southern Command in the Army Command Challenge Cup, and featured regularly for the British Army representative team.

The Bully Wee won four trophies in season 1951–52. As the team won Division Two, McPhail finished as top scorer in the league. He also scored in three separate cup finals, the Glasgow Cup, Charity Cup, and Supplementary Cup, all of which were won.

In May 1956 he signed for Celtic for £2,500, the team his elder brother John had previously captained. He made his debut in a 2–1 Scottish League Cup win against Aberdeen. Later that season, McPhail scored twice in the League Cup final, helping Celtic lift the trophy for the first time. The following year, he starred in the Celtic team that played fierce Old Firm rivals Rangers in the final of the same competition. The match, referred to by fans in poem and song as "Hampden in the sun", resulted in a record 7–1 victory to Celtic, with McPhail scoring a hat-trick.

A knee and ankle injury forced McPhail to retire the following year, after just two seasons with Celtic. He played just 57 games for the club in the major domestic competitions, however he is widely described as a "hero" or "idol" for his three goals in the 1957 final which remains a record margin of victory in the fixture. John McPhail had also scored three goals against Rangers, in the 1950 Glasgow Merchants Charity Cup; this is the only occasion in Old Firm history that brothers achieved this feat.

He was listed on the Greatest 50 Celtic Legends by the Evening Times in 2013.

International career 

While never capped at full international level, McPhail was included in the Scotland squad for a game against Wales in 1955, but was forced to withdraw through injury.

He did net a hat-trick for a Scotland XI against Sunderland in a benefit match for Jimmy Mason of Third Lanark in 1953. In addition, he scored another hat-trick for a Scottish B League XI against an Irish B League XI in 1952.

Health problems 
According to his wife Ophelia, McPhail discovered in the 1990s that the left hemisphere of his brain was damaged. Then aged in his 70s, he had displayed signs of dementia since his 30s, and was eventually diagnosed with Alzheimer's disease. McPhail, with the support of medical specialists, associated the neurological symptoms with heading the leather football used in the 1950s, explaining how "the ball used to get very heavy when it rained – when you took that full in the forehead it nearly knocked you over."

In 1999 McPhail launched a legal case claiming he was entitled to disability payments. However, an industrial tribunal did not accept that a clash of heads during his playing career could have caused the dementia. The tribunal would not consider whether heading the ball might have contributed, as it categorised that as "part of the job [as a footballer]" and not an industrial injury. The decision was upheld by the Social Security Commissioner of Scotland.

McPhail's condition and its possible causes were discussed during a BBC Scotland investigative television programme on the subject in 2000, also featuring another former Celtic forward Jock Weir who was suffering from a similar illness. His mental health continued to deteriorate and he died in Glasgow on 4 April 2003.

Career statistics

Notes

Representative matches 

Scores and results list for Scotland XI's, Scottish League XI's, and British Army XI's goal tally first.

Honours

Clyde
 Scottish Division Two: 1951–52
 Supplementary Cup: 1951–52
 Glasgow Cup: 1951–52 
 Glasgow Charity Cup: 1951–52 

Celtic
 Scottish League Cup: 1956–57, 1957–58

See also 
 History of Celtic F.C.
 Jeff Astle

References

External links

Review of Hampden in the Sun

1928 births
2003 deaths
Footballers from Glasgow
Association football forwards
Scottish footballers
Queen's Park F.C. players
Clyde F.C. players
Celtic F.C. players
Scottish Football League players
Deaths from Alzheimer's disease
Deaths from dementia in Scotland